Gustav-Adolf-Straße station is a Nuremberg U-Bahn station, located on the U3. Named for the Swedish king Gustavus Adolphus

References

Nuremberg U-Bahn stations
Railway stations in Germany opened in 2008